Dego is a town and comune in the Province of Savona in the region Liguria, in Northwestern Italy.

Geography
The municipality of Dego is located on the northern side of the Ligurian Apennines, on the border with Piedmont; the main population centre is lies at the confluence of the Grillero stream into the Bormida di Spigno.

Dego borders the municipalities of Piana Crixia and Spigno Monferrato to the north; Giusvalla to the east; Cairo Montenotte to the south; Castelletto Uzzone and Gottasecca to the west.

References

External links
 Official website

Cities and towns in Liguria